Tobias Rühle (born 7 February 1991) is a German footballer who plays for Regionalliga Südwest club SSV Ulm 1846.

Career
After his contract with Sonnenhof Großaspach had expired at the end of the 2015-16 season, he joined Preußen Münster on a two-year contract starting 1 July 2016.

On 25 March 2019 KFC Uerdingen 05 confirmed, that they had signed Rühle for the upcoming 2019/20 season.
On 31 January 2020, he joined SSV Ulm 1846 on a contract until the summer 2022.

References

External links
 Profile at Soccerway
 
 Profile at DFB.de

1991 births
Living people
German footballers
Germany youth international footballers
VfB Stuttgart II players
1. FC Heidenheim players
Stuttgarter Kickers players
SG Sonnenhof Großaspach players
KFC Uerdingen 05 players
SSV Ulm 1846 players
3. Liga players
Association football midfielders
Association football forwards
SC Preußen Münster players